Nevin Campbell Hughes-Jones FRCP, FRS (born 10 February 1923) is a British haematologist, and a Life Fellow of Hughes Hall, Cambridge.

Between 1952 and 1988 Hughes-Jones worked for the Medical Research Council's Experimental Haematology unit at St Mary's Hospital Medical School and for the Molecular Immunopathology Unit at Cambridge.

Following formal retirement, he continued to research on Rhesus antigens and their antibodies, at Cambridge.

He has also written on matters related to international relations and peace.

Works

References

External links
 

British medical researchers
Fellows of the Royal Society
Fellows of Hughes Hall, Cambridge
Living people
Fellows of the Royal College of Physicians
British haematologists
Medical Research Council (United Kingdom) people
1923 births